Léna Grandveau (born 21 January 2003) is a French female handball player who plays for French club Neptunes de Nantes.

She also represented France in the 2019 European Women's U-17 Handball Championship, were she received bronze. She was awarded to the All-Star Team, as best Centre back of the tournament.

Achievements
Youth European Championship:
Bronze Medalist: 2019

Individual awards
 All-Star Team Best Centre back of the Youth European Championship: 2019

References

2003 births
Living people
French female handball players